Saint-Aubin-Épinay is a commune in the Seine-Maritime department in the Normandy region in north-western France.

Geography
The small river Aubette has its source within the commune's borders.

History
Commune created in 1823 by the reunion of the former communes of Épinay and Saint-Aubin-la-Rivière.

Population

Places of interest
 The church of St. Aubin in Saint-Aubin-la-Rivière, dating from the nineteenth century.
 The manorhouse du Meslay.
 A watermill.
 The seventeenth-century church of Notre-Dame in Épinay-sur-Aubette.
 A dovecote.

See also
Communes of the Seine-Maritime department

References

Communes of Seine-Maritime